Farewell Love! (Italian: Addio, amore!) is a 1943 Italian historical drama film directed by Gianni Franciolini and starring Jacqueline Laurent, Clara Calamai and Roldano Lupi. It is based on the 1890 novel of the same title by Matilde Serao.

It was shot at the Scalera Studios in Rome. The film's sets were designed by the art director Gastone Medin.

Cast
 Jacqueline Laurent as Anna Acquaviva
 Clara Calamai as Laura Acquaviva
 Roldano Lupi as Cesare Dias
 Leonardo Cortese as Luigi Caracciolo
 Renato Cialente as Carafa
 Giuseppe Rinaldi as Giustino Morelli
 Evelina Paoli as La signora Stella Martini
 Dhia Cristiani as Sofia
 Nando Tamberlani as Il maggiordomo di casa Caracciolo
 Riccardo Fellini as 	Un amico di Luigi
 Olinto Cristina as Il dottore Montechiaro
 Peppino Spadaro as Il cameriere di casa Acquaviva
 Vanni Torrigiani as Il cameriere di casa Dias
 Cosetta Greco as La cameriera di casa Dias

References

Bibliography
 Gundle, Stephen. Fame Amid the Ruins: Italian Film Stardom in the Age of Neorealism. Berghahn Books, 2019.

External links

1943 films
1940s Italian-language films
1943 drama films
Italian historical drama films
1940s historical drama films
Films set in the 1880s
Films set in Naples
Films based on Italian novels
Italian black-and-white films
Films directed by Gianni Franciolini
Italian drama films
Lux Film films
Films shot at Scalera Studios
1940s Italian films